Springfield is a ward in the London Borough of Hackney occupying much of Upper Clapton and some of Stamford Hill; the ward is part of the Hackney North and Stoke Newington constituency. The name is derived from Springfield Park.

Elections 
The ward returns three councillors to the Borough Council, with elections every four years. At the last election on 6 May 2010, Michael Levy and Simche Steinberger (both Conservative Party candidates); and Margaret Gordon (Labour Party) were returned. Turnout was 57%; with 3,993 votes cast.

Demography 
In 2001, Springfield ward had a total population of 10,854. This compares with the average ward population within the borough of 10,674. The population at the 2011 Census was 12,371.

References

External links
 London Borough of Hackney list of constituencies and councillors.
 Conservative Party's borough site.
Hackney Labour Party

Wards of the London Borough of Hackney
1965 establishments in England